Scinax tigrinus is a frog in the family Hylidae.  It is endemic to Brazil.

The adult male frog measures 28.4 to 30.8 mm long in snout-vent length.  This frog has orange-yellow flash color in the form of transverse stripes on its hind legs.

References

Frogs of South America
tigrinus
Amphibians described in 2010